Line Uno (born 19 October 1993) is a Danish handball player for Viborg HK and the Danish national team.

References

1993 births
Living people
People from Kolding
Danish female handball players
Sportspeople from the Region of Southern Denmark